
Snainton is a village and civil parish in the Scarborough district of North Yorkshire, England.

According to the 2011 UK Census, Snainton parish had a population of 754, a decrease on the 2001 UK Census figure of 891.

Notable people
The actor Sir Ben Kingsley was born in Snainton.

George Vasey the botanist was also born in the village. He was responsible for the integration of the United States Department of Agriculture.

Sydney Cross Harland (19 July 1891 – 8 November 1982), Botanist, was born in the village, and died there in November 1982, after many commissions abroad. His great-grandfather William, was the cousin of Edward Harland.

See also
Snainton railway station

References

External links

Snainton parish council website

 
Villages in North Yorkshire
Civil parishes in North Yorkshire
Borough of Scarborough